Ismael Manny "East" Carlo (born January 29, 1942) is a Puerto Rican actor. He has sometimes been credited as East Carlo or Ismael East Carlo.

Life and career
Carlo was born in Cabo Rojo, Puerto Rico, and raised in Spanish Harlem. He served in the U.S. Army after enlisting at age 17. He was stationed in Panama. From New York he moved to Florida, where he took a job as a janitor at a local theater and it was at that juncture his acting career started.

He started appearing in TV shows back in the 1970s, like his role in Caribe (1975) in the lady killer episode, he played lately the role of Don Diego in the comedy movie Bandidas (2006). He also appeared briefly in the series Prison Break, on episode 15 of the second season.

Family
He has been married twice.

Filmography

Television

Film

Miscellaneous Crew

External links

1942 births
Living people
People from Cabo Rojo, Puerto Rico
People from East Harlem
Puerto Rican male film actors
Puerto Rican male television actors
United States Army soldiers